Maxim Aliaksandravič Znak (born 4 September 1981) is a Belarusian lawyer and politician, part of Viktar Babaryka's team, lawyer of Sviatlana Tsikhanouskaya, and a member of the presidium of the Coordination Council formed during the 2020–21 Belarusian protests in opposition to the rule of Alexander Lukashenko. Along with fellow opposition leader Maria Kolesnikova, Znak actively participated in the demonstrations and protests against the Lukashenko government after Sviatlana Tsikhanouskaya had left the country. He was sentenced to 10 years in prison by the Belarusian authorities.

Childhood and education
Znak obtained his PhD in Law from the Belarusian State University.

Legal career
Znak provided legal support for presidential candidate Viktar Babaryka, who was jailed in June 2020 during the Lukashenko 26-year presidency of Belarus, prior to the 2020 Belarusian presidential election. Babaryka had intended to contest the 2020 Belarus election before being rejected by election officials.

Coordination Council and detention 

Znak is one of the members of the presidium of the Coordination Council of Belarus that aims to help coordinate a transition to democracy in Belarus.

On 9 September 2020, he was abducted and detained by a gang of masked men wearing plain clothes. Prior to his detention, he was widely regarded as the last active member of the Coordination Council. He was detained by supporters of Lukashenko just two days after the forced deportation of his colleague and the former opposition leader Maria Kolesnikova. On 9 September, Znak had planned to attend a video press conference with Babaryka. He was kidnapped by masked men and did not attend the press conference. Znak's colleagues stated that he was detained in Minsk and that he had texted the word "masks" to them after his abduction. , the Coordination Council has been unable to contact Maxim Znak following his detention. He has been briefly described as a "missing person".

On 9 November 2020 Znak's attorneys announced that his detention had been extended to 9 January 2021. As of 21 January 2021, he has remained in SIZO No. 1 in Minsk.

On February 12, Znak and fellow Coordination Council member Maria Kalesnikava were charged with “conspiracy to seize state power in an unconstitutional manner” and “establishing and leading an extremist organization. On 9 March, Znak's attorney announced that his pre-trial detention had been extended through 9 May 2021.

Starting 4 August 2021, after almost 11 months in custody, Znak and Kalesnikava stood trial behind closed doors in the Minsk Regional Court. They faced up to 12 years in prison. Both pleaded non guilty. Throughout the investigation and trial, the details of the charges were not publicly disclosed. The attorneys of Kalesnikava and Znak were under a nondisclosure agreement. Znak explained that the court sessions were closed because the authorities did not want the public to know that 'the charges are not reality based'.

On 6 September 2021, Znak was sentenced to 10 years in prison. Amnesty International condemned the sentence. On September 21, 2021, Znak and Kalesnikava appealed against their sentences to the State Supreme Court.

See also
List of kidnappings
List of people who disappeared

References 

1981 births
2020s missing person cases
Belarusian lawyers
Belarusian dissidents
Political prisoners according to Viasna Human Rights Centre
Belarusian State University alumni
Politicians from Minsk
Belarusian political prisoners
Living people